Do Good Design: How Designers Can Change The World is a book by Canadian designer David B. Berman, with a foreword by Erik Spiekermann, published by Peachpit Press in January 2009. The book was co-published by AIGA.

Book 
The book focuses on graphic design, branding, and social responsibility and often makes connections with environmentalism. Berman pays special attention to the effect of design in the developing world, the deeds and misdeeds of the Coca-Cola Corporation, and women in advertising. Some ideas in Berman's book derive from those of Ken Garland, author of the First Things First manifesto in the 1960s. Garland was the first person to take the Do Good Pledge on the book's website.

The book is divided into three sections, ending with a call for all professionals to sign the online Do Good Pledge, which has been signed by notable designers, including Ken Garland.

Reception 
The book has been adopted in colleges and universities as a textbook or required reading for students in social responsibility, including Virginia Commonwealth University, whose design program has been rated number one amongst U.S. public universities by U.S. News & World Report.

Editions 
Chinese language edition  official release: Beijing, October 27, 2009 at World Design Congress, with foreword by Min Wang (head of graphic design Beijing Olympics, chief of design at Chinese Academy of Fine Arts).
Russian language edition released January 2010.
Korean language edition released July 2010.
Indonesian language edition released December 2010.
Braille edition published in Jakarta (2010)
2013 English edition launched April 22, 2013 (Earth Day) with updated content, and printed on 100% post-consumer materials on Mohawk Papers, under FSC stewardship.
Spanish language edition released July 2015.

See also 
 Adbusters

References

External links 
 Official website and library of link extensions to the book's content
 Official Do Good Design blog by David Berman

2009 non-fiction books
Graphic design
Books about the media
Marketing books
Canadian political books